Charleville is a rural town and locality in the Shire of Murweh, Queensland, Australia.

Geography 
It is the largest town and administrative centre of the Shire of Murweh, which covers an area of 43,905 square kilometres. Charleville is situated on the banks of the Warrego River.

Charleville is the terminus for the Warrego Highway which stretches  from Brisbane.

The Mitchell Highway also connects Charleville with:

History

Bidjara (also known as Bidyara, Pitjara, and Peechara) is an Australian Aboriginal language spoken by the Bidjara people. The Bidjara language region includes the local government areas of the Shire of Murweh, particularly the towns of Charleville, Augathella and Blackall as well as the properties of Nive Downs and Mount Tabor.

Gungabula (also known as Kongabula and Khungabula) is an Australian Aboriginal language of the headwaters of the Dawson River in Central Queensland. The language region includes areas within the local government area of Maranoa Region, particularly the towns of Charleville, Augathella and Blackall and as well as the Carnarvon Range.

The first European exploration of the area, which was Kunja tribal land, was conducted by Edmund Kennedy in 1847.

Gowrie Station had been established around the Gowrie Crossing, a ford across the Warrego River along a natural stock route, for the grazing of sheep and cattle.

The town was gazetted on 11 January 1865. It was situated near Gowrie's Crossing, a permanent waterhole, now on the outskirts of the modern town. It was planned with very wide streets to enable bullock teams of up to 14 pairs to turn with their wagons. It was William Alcock Tully, who was Commissioner of Crown Lands in the Warrego District from 1863 to 1864 and would later serve as Surveyor General of Queensland from 1875 to 1889, who laid out the town's streets. An Irishman, Tully probably named the town after the town of Charleville, County Cork, Ireland.

A hotel was built in 1865. Charleville Post Office opened on 1 August 1865 and a town began to grow to service the region.

Members of the Roma-based Skinner family established a store in the town in 1872 that became known as the Warrego Stores.

In September 1875, the Queensland Government called for tenders to erect a courthouse in Charleville. The foundation stone (actually a bloodwood block) was laid on 23 November 1875. By January 1876, the courthouse was almost finished.

In December 1884, the Queensland Government called for tenders to erect a hospital in Charleville. In March 1885 the contract was awarded to Richards and King for  £2,265 10s. In November 1885, a hospital ball was held in the new hospital building, suggesting it was completed and opened around that time.

Cobb and Co, the legendary Australian stagecoach company, established a coach building business in the town in 1886. however, the railway arrived in 1888, beginning the long demise of coach transport in the area. Charleville railway station opened on 1 March 1888 and was the terminus for the Western railway line until the line was extended south to Cunnamulla in 1898. Facilities included a locomotive depot, cattle and sheep yards, a 50-ton weighbridge, a booking and telegraph offices, goods shed, stationmaster's house, and guards, enginemen and firemen's cottages. Apart from the railway station in Charleville, there were also two now-abandoned railway sidings:

 Dalgety's Siding railway siding
 Glenroy Scour Siding

Charleville railway station is a railway station used by Queensland Rail and passenger stop for Greyhound Australia.

In July 1886 the Anglican residents of the town decided to erect a church. All Saint's Anglican Church was opened on by Rev. B. R. Wilson on 20 November 1887. It was designed by diocesan architect John Hingestone Buckeridge and built by Mr Wood. It was dedicated in 1897. The foundation stone for the present church was laid in September 1957 by Archbishop Reginald Halse. The new church was dedicated in 1958 and consecrated in 1967.

In 1902 Charleville was the location of an unsuccessful attempt by Clement Lindley Wragge to fire cannons into the clouds in order to break a drought. The cannons used remain on display in Charleville today.

St Mary's Catholic Primary School was opened on 26 January 1913 by the Sisters of Mercy.

In 1922, Qantas established an airmail service between Charleville and Cloncurry. At the same time, this was Qantas's first regularly scheduled route and the second scheduled air route in Australia.

On 9 October 1924, the Charleville War Memorial was unveiled by Sir Matthew Nathan, the Governor of Queensland.

The Anglican Chapel of the Holy Angels Hostels was consecrated circa 1929. It closed circa 1984.

Charleville was also one of the compulsory stop over/check points during the London to Melbourne MacRobertson Air Race in 1934. The winners of the great race were Tom Campbell Black and C. W. A. Scott. Their triumph was reported in Time magazine as:

"Scott and Black, keeping up their sensational pace, flashed into Charleville, refueled, sped toward the finish where waiting thousands cheered their progress, reported over loudspeakers. With one motor dead, with only two hours sleep since leaving England, the Britons triumphantly set their scarlet torpedo down in Melbourne at 3:34 p.m. In 71 hr. 1 min. 3 sec. – Just under three days – they had flown halfway around the world."

Proximity to the Warrego River has been problematic. In April 1990, major floods hit western Queensland, with Charleville being badly affected. Floodwaters peaked at 8.54 metres, over 1,000 homes were inundated, and almost 3,000 people evacuated. More recently, the district suffered flooding again in 1997, 2008 and March 2010. Flooding also occurred in February 2012.

In the  the locality of Charleville had a population of 3,335 people. Aboriginal and Torres Strait Islander people made up 15.3% of the population. 83.6% of people were born in Australia. The next most common country of birth was Vietnam at 3.3%. 87.6% of people spoke only English at home. Other languages spoken at home included Vietnamese at 3.5%. The most common responses for religion were Catholic 34.1%, Anglican 24.1% and No Religion 17.2%,

Heritage listings
Charleville has a number of heritage-listed sites, including:
 87 Alfred Street: former Queensland National Bank
 Edward Street: Charleville War Memorial
 King Street: Charleville railway station
 Mitchell Highway: Landsborough's Blazed Tree (Camp 67)
 33 Wills Street: Hotel Corones
as well as a number in nearby localities:
  south-west of Charleville off the Diamantina Developmental Road in Bakers Bend: Myendetta Homestead
  south of Charleville off the Mitchell Highway in Bakers Bend: Landsborough's Blazed Tree (Camp 69)

Education 
Charleville State School is a government primary (Early Childhood-6) school for boys and girls at Wills Street. In 2018, the school had an enrolment of 205 students with 20 teachers (19 full-time equivalent) and 22 non-teaching staff (16 full-time equivalent). It includes a special education program (certified through the National Disability Insurance Scheme).

St Mary's School is a Catholic primary (Prep-6) school for boys and girls at 66 Watson Street. In 2018, the school had an enrolment of 117 students with 9 teachers (8 full-time equivalent) and 9 non-teaching staff (4 full-time equivalent).

Charleville State High School is a government secondary (7-12) school for boys and girls on the corner of Partridge & Hunter Streets. It was established in 1961, replacing the Secondary Department at Charleville State School. In 2018, the school had an enrolment of 246 students (including students from Augathella, Morven and Wyandra) with 36 teachers (34 full-time equivalent) and 21 non-teaching staff (16 full-time equivalent). It includes a special education program (certified through the National Disability Insurance Scheme).

Charleville School of Distance Education is a government primary and secondary (Early Childhood-10) school for boys and girls at Parry Street. In 2018, the school had an enrolment of 200 students with 25 teachers (24 full-time equivalent) and 12 non-teaching staff (10 full-time equivalent). It is a School of the Air, providing distance education by a combination of postal services, telephone and Internet to children who are unable to attend a regular school due to their remote location.

Facilities 

Charleville has a range of facilities for the community including a swimming pool, bowling green, speedway, racing course, and the Gowrie sporting oval.

There is a public library on Alfred Street run by the Murweh Shire Council with a high-speed Internet connection (through the National Broadband Network).

The Charleville branch of the Queensland Country Women's Association has its rooms at 145 Alfred Street.

The Charleville Golf Course has eighteen sand greens and a licensed clubhouse in May Street.

The Charleville Bowls Club has two rinks and a licensed clubhouse in Epacris Street.

All Saints Anglican Church is at 41 Alfred Street.

Lutheran church services are held at Bluecare Community Centre at 145 Alfred Street.

North of the town is VMC, a marine weather transmitter operated by the Bureau of Meteorology.

Media 
The local newspaper is the Western Times. Along with many other regional Australian newspapers owned by NewsCorp, the newspaper ceased print editions in June 2020 and became an online-only publication from 26 June 2020.

Charleville is home to the following radio stations:

 ABC Western Queensland - 603 AM
 4VL (Resonate Broadcasting) - 918 AM
 Vision Christian Radio - 87.6 FM
 West FM (Resonate Broadcasting) - 101.7 FM
 4RR FM (Bidjara Media & Broadcasting Company Ltd) - 105.7 FM
 ABC Radio National - 107.3 FM

The Australian Broadcasting Corporation transmits ABQ and its sister Channels, ABC Kids, ABC TV Plus, ABC Me and ABC NEWS to Charleville through its relay station, ABCEQ, situated at 26°24′59″S 146°21′20″E. As part of its regional and rural coverage expansion, the ABC opened a news bureau in Charleville in 2022. It was officially opened on 10 March 2022 by the ABC's managing director David Anderson and Federal Minister for Agriculture and Northern Australia David Littleproud.

The Seven Network and its sister channels 7two and 7mate transmit to Charleville through its regional area affiliate, ITQ.

Network Ten and its sister channels 10 Bold and 10 Peach transmit to Charleville through its regional area affiliate, CDT

The Nine Network and its sister channels 9Gem and 9Go! transmit to Charleville through its regional area affiliate, Imparja Television

The Special Broadcasting Service and its sister channels SBS Viceland, SBS World Movies and SBS Food also transmit to Charleville.

Attractions
Tourist attractions include:
 Charleville Royal Flying Doctor Service of Australia Visitor Centre
Charleville Historical Museum
  Cosmos Centre, a stargazing centre
 World War II Secret Base, displaying the activities of the 3500 United States Army Air Force personnel stationed in Charleville in 1943
Charleville Bilby Experience, a wildlife sanctuary which runs a captive breeding program for the greater bilby, a vulnerable species

Transport 

It has two runways, both sealed.

The Westlander rail passenger service links the Charleville railway station to Brisbane. Charleville would have been the southern end of the Transcontinental railway proposed in the 1880s, connecting to Point Parker on the Gulf of Carpentaria.

Prior to 10 December 2021, Charleville was serviced by Bus Queensland who operated daily coach services to and from Brisbane via Toowoomba, Dalby, Chinchilla, Miles, Roma, Mitchell and Morven and vice versa. Charleville was also a scheduled stop for Bus Queensland's daily services from Brisbane to Mount Isa and vice versa.

Since 11 December 2021 Charleville has been serviced by Greyhound Australia who operate the following services which it regained from Bus Queensland under a contract from the Queensland Government:

Climate 

Charleville experiences a hot semi-arid climate (Köppen: BSh, Trewartha: BShl); with very hot summers with moderate rains; warm to hot, relatively dry springs and autumns; and mild, dry winters. Summers are very hot, and depending on wind direction, very dry or very humid. Winters are mild to cool and crisp, with rather high diurnal ranges, which provide some frost. Rainfall is mild and distributed patchily throughout the year, with a peak in summer. Severe flooding events are usually caused by monsoon troughs and the remnants of tropical cyclones dumping large amounts of rain over the area; however, rain normally falls in the form of thunderstorms and light showers after hot summer days.

Notable people

Davida Allen (born 1951), painter, film maker and writer
Daryl Beattie (born 1970), former professional Grand Prix motorcycle racer and television motor sports commentator
Richard Bell (born 1953), artist and political activist
Cameron Boyce (born 1989), first-class cricketer
Kurt Capewell (born 1993), Premiership winning National Rugby League footballer with the Penrith Panthers. Now with the Brisbane Broncos
Luke Capewell (born 1989), former National Rugby League footballer
Andrew Dutney (born 1958), President of the Assembly of the Uniting Church in Australia
Peter Everett, television presenter
Richard Graham (born 1972), Australian Rugby Union coach
Rhan Hooper (born 1988), former professional Australian rules footballer
Chelsea Jane (born 1992), rapper and songwriter
Matthew Mott (born 1973), former first-class cricketer and coach
Libby Munro (born 1981), actress
Billy Rogers (born 1989), former National Rugby League footballer
Neil Turner (1934–2011), politician, State Member for Warrego (1974 - 1986) and State Member for Nicklin (1989 - 1998)
Adrian Vowles (born 1971), former National Rugby League footballer

In popular culture

An eponymous country music song about Charleville was written by Don Walker and recorded by Slim Dusty on his album Ringer from the Top End and later by Walker's own band Catfish on the album Ruby.
The asteroid 13933 Charleville is named in the town's honour .
A children's book called The Flood Grungies written by Michelle Sheehan and illustrated by Donna Reynolds. It is about the notorious Charleville floods and features the Cosmos centre, the water tower and other famous landmarks.

References

External links

 University of Queensland: Queensland Places: Charleville
 Murweh Shire Council – Official site
 Weather Information
 About Charleville
 

 
Towns in Queensland
South West Queensland
Populated places established in 1865
1865 establishments in Australia
Shire of Murweh
Localities in Queensland